Sar Davan (also Romanized as Sar Davān and Sardvān; also known as Sardāb, Shirdau, and Shīrdow) is a village in Zohan Rural District, Zohan District, Zirkuh County, South Khorasan Province, Iran. At the 2006 census, its population was 399, in 94 families.

References 

Populated places in Zirkuh County